Harry Cowley (born 1890, died 1971) was a working class organizer, social activist and anti-fascist in Brighton, England.

Biography
Born in 1890 in Brighton, and working as a chimney sweep, he became involved in grass-roots social activism from the 1920s until his death in the 1970s. He helped organise the unemployed and moved homeless families into squatted buildings after both world wars with his group the Vigilantes.

Cowley was a key figure in confronting fascism in 1930s Brighton. He was put in hospital for eight months when he was alone and ran into a group of fascists on Middle Street, who broke his leg. He took his revenge by organising an attack on a meeting of the Fascist League on the Level, a park in Brighton.

Cowley became leader of the 'Barrow Boys' in the 1920s. They sold cheap fruit and vegetables out of wheelbarrows on Oxford Street. When the Council attempted to clear the barrows in response to the complaints of local shops, Cowley made a fiery speech to a crowd and when the police attempted to clear it, the protest became known as 'The Battle of Oxford Street.' The barrow boys were subsequently allowed to sell fruit and vegetables on the Level and then, in 1926, the Open Market was built.

In addition, Cowley mobilised pensioners, was involved in running social events and social centres and organised practical aid for the poor and disadvantaged of the town. His actions were based in local neighbourhoods and outside political parties. When Harry died in 1971, 500 people filled St. Peters church on London Road for his funeral.

Legacy
The Cowley Club in Brighton was named after him as a sign of its aim of furthering this tradition of grass-roots organising and class solidarity. Bus operator Brighton & Hove has named a bus after Cowley.

References

External links
 Cowley Club website
 Queens Park Books: Who was Harry Cowley?

1890 births
1971 deaths
British anti-poverty advocates
20th-century squatters
People from Brighton